John Oswald "Ossie" Newton-Thompson  (2 December 1920 – 3 April 1974) was a South African sportsman and politician. He played international rugby union for England and was also a first-class cricketer. From 1961 until his death in 1974, Newton-Thompson was a member of the South African parliament.

Early life and education

Newton-Thompson was born in London to lawyer Cyril Newton-Thompson and his wife Joyce Newton-Thompson, who later became the first female Mayor of Cape Town. He, however grew up in South Africa, where he attended Diocesan College and then the University of Cape Town. In 1940 he returned to England after receiving a Rhodes Scholarship for Trinity College, Oxford. His brother was Christopher Newton Thompson.

World War II

His studies at Oxford were interrupted by World War II, where he served with the South African Air Force. He was awarded a DFC after fighting with a Spitfire Squadron in Italy.

Sport at Oxford University

In 1946, Newton-Thompson appeared in seven first-class matches for the Oxford University Cricket Club as a right handed middle order batsman. He could only score 171 runs from 14 innings and went wicket-less from his 24 overs of right-arm slow bowling.

He also played rugby union for Oxford University as a scrum-half and was the team's captain in 1946.

International rugby

England selected Newton-Thompson in two Tests during their 1947 Five Nations Championship campaign, which saw them share the title with Wales. He was first capped in England's win over Scotland at Twickenham and made his other appearance in their defeat of France at the same venue.

Return to South Africa

Newton-Thompson played two further first-class cricket matches after returning to South Africa. He scored 78 in his debut innings for Western Province against the Marylebone Cricket Club in Cape Town, his only half century at that level. Four of the MCC's bowlers were Test cricketers, including a young Alec Bedser, who dismissed him in both innings. He was then picked in a Cape Province representative team which played the MCC a week later but he couldn't repeat his previous effort and scored 0 and 28.

A lawyer, he ran successfully in 1961 for a seat in the House of Assembly of South Africa, as the United Party candidate for Pinelands.

Death

He re-contested his seat in the 1974 general election and was campaigning in South West Africa when he was killed in an air crash.

References

1920 births
1974 deaths
South African rugby union players
England international rugby union players
Oxford University RFC players
South African cricketers
Oxford University cricketers
Western Province cricketers
South African sportsperson-politicians
United Party (South Africa) politicians
Members of the House of Assembly (South Africa)
South African World War II pilots
Recipients of the Distinguished Flying Cross (United Kingdom)
20th-century South African lawyers
South African Rhodes Scholars
Alumni of Trinity College, Oxford
Alumni of Diocesan College, Cape Town
University of Cape Town alumni
South African people of English descent
White South African people
Victims of aviation accidents or incidents in Namibia
Rugby union scrum-halves
Rugby union players from Paddington